Odacir Pereira da Silva (born 28 February 1988, in Itaqui), known as Itaqui, is a Brazilian footballer. He currently plays for Juventude.

Personal life
Itaqui's nephew, Gerethes Cleucir Souza da Silva, is also a professional footballer who goes by the same nickname.

Honours
Rio Grande do Sul State League: 2007

Contract
2 May 2006 to 1 May 2011

References

External links
 sambafoot
 CBF
 Guardian Stats Centre
 zerozero.pt
 globoesporte
 Guardian's Stats Centre

1988 births
Living people
Brazilian footballers
Campeonato Brasileiro Série A players
Campeonato Brasileiro Série B players
Grêmio Foot-Ball Porto Alegrense players
Paulista Futebol Clube players
Clube Náutico Capibaribe players
Guarani FC players
Sociedade Esportiva e Recreativa Caxias do Sul players
Paraná Clube players
Criciúma Esporte Clube players
União Agrícola Barbarense Futebol Clube players
Esporte Clube Juventude players
Boa Esporte Clube players
Association football midfielders